The Pavy Formation is a geologic formation in Nunavut. It preserves fossil insects of Carabites feildenianus, dating back to the Thanetian stage of the Paleocene period.

Description 
The Pavy Formation is interpreted to be fluvial in origin. Trough-crossbedded sandstone facies dominate this formation and were probably channel deposits of a braided river system, with interbeds of siltstone and mudrock representing floodplain deposits. Where thicker intervals of mudrock occur, backswamp ponds or shallow-lake conditions were probably present. Only at Watercourse Valley and Pavy River did conditions stabilize long enough for swamps to develop, producing thick coal beds.

See also 
 List of fossiliferous stratigraphic units in Nunavut
 Margaret Formation

References

Bibliography 
 

Paleogene Nunavut
Paleocene Series of North America
Thanetian Stage
Siltstone formations
Coal formations
Coal in Canada
Fluvial deposits
Paleontology in Nunavut